Porterville may refer to:

 Porterville, California
 Porterville, Kansas
 Porterville, Mississippi
 Porterville, Texas
 Porterville, Utah
 Porterville, Western Cape in South Africa
 "Porterville", a song by Creedence Clearwater Revival from their debut album Creedence Clearwater Revival